The Open Door (Arabic: الباب المفتوح, translit. El-Bab el-Maftuh) is a 1963 Egyptian drama film directed by Henry Barakat and starring Faten Hamama, Mahmoud Moursy, and Saleh Selim. The film is based on the 1960 novel of the same name by Egyptian writer Latifa al-Zayyat.

Plot
Known in English as "The Open Door", another great movie about women's right in their different role and life and their struggle between her father with his old style and her husband that doesn't understand her.

Cast
Faten Hamama as Laila
Mahmoud Mousry as Fouad
 Saleh Selim as Hussain
 Shouweikar as Gamila
 Hasan Youssef as Isam

References

1963 films
1960s Arabic-language films